Simpliciforma is a monotypic genus of brachiopods belonging to the order Terebratulida, family unassigned. The only species is Simpliciforma profunda.

The species is found in northeastern Pacific Ocean.

References

Brachiopod genera
Terebratulida
Monotypic brachiopod genera